Alvanite (IMA symbol: Alv) is a zinc nickel aluminum vanadate mineral with the chemical formula O. It was originally discovered in the Karatau Mountains.

References

External links 

 Alvanite data sheet
 Alvanite on the Handbook of Mineralogy

Zinc minerals
Nickel minerals
Aluminium minerals
Vanadate minerals
Minerals described in 1959